The 2023 Dubai World Cup is a horse race scheduled to be run at Meydan Racecourse in Dubai on 25 March 2023. It will be the 27th running of the race. The total prize money for the race is $12 million, with the winner receiving $7.2 million.

See also

2023 Saudi Cup

References

External links

Dubai Racing Club
Emirates Racing Authority

2023
2023 in horse racing
2023 in Emirati sport
March 2023 sports events in the United Arab Emirates
Scheduled sports events